The 2021 Cologne Centurions season was the first season of the new Cologne Centurions team in the inaugural season of the European League of Football.

Regular season

Standings

Schedule

Source: europeanleague.football

Cologne qualified for the playoffs despite losing the head-to-head against the Leipzig Kings (both teams having won their away game against the other, but Leipzig with a bigger margin) as the rules in place for the 2021 season guaranteed playoff spots to the top two teams of each division regardless of record. The city of Cologne was also the only city with both an ELF and a GFL team reaching the Playoffs in their respective 2021 seasons as the Cologne Crocodiles placed third in the GFL North, reaching the quarter final of the 2021 German Football League. Cologne was also the only team to lose three games against the same opponent in the 2021 season, losing to Frankfurt Galaxy both at home and on the road in the regular season and again on the road in the playoffs.

Transactions
On July 21, the team signed American DL Mike Taylor III, to strengthen a defense ravaged by injuries. Due to the rule regarding 4 maximum import players on a team, American QB Danny Farley was removed from the active roster, but remained with the team as an offensive assistant coach.

Roster

Notes

References 

Cologne Centurions (ELF) seasons
Cologne Centurions
Cologne Centurions